CMH may refer to:

 The IATA code for John Glenn Columbus International Airport in Columbus, Ohio
 The National Rail station code for Cwmbach railway station in Rhondda Cynon Taf, Wales
 CMH Records
 Cambridge Military Hospital
 Canadian Mountain Holidays
 Canadian Museum of History
 United States Army Center of Military History
 Central Middlesex Hospital
 Ceramic discharge metal-halide lamp
 Children's Memorial Hospital
 Children's Museum of Houston
 Cohen Modal Haplotype
 Combined Military Hospital
 Combined Military Hospital (Dhaka)
 Community mental health
 Congressional Medal of Honor
 Consolidated Media Holdings
 Creatine monohydrate